Salindh is a small village which borders the town of Safipur in the Unnao district (located between Lucknow and Kanpur) of the Indian state of Uttar Pradesh.

Location 

Salindh is seventeen kilometers (just under 11 miles) from Unnao district and one kilometer (0.6 miles) from Safipur.

Economy 

The main economic occupation is agriculture, in particular a mango plantation.

Festivals 
The annual ‘gagar’ festival celebrates the anniversary of Saint Makhdoom Saheb.

Demographics 

The demographic groups that live in Salindh are Chamars, Ahirs, Nai, Telis, Kurmis, and Muslims. 

In the mid-20th century, poverty and land issues drove a few people to migrate to Lucknow, Kanpur, Unnao, Bombay, and even some foreign countries.

References

Villages in Unnao district